Sally Moore defeated Anna Dmitrieva in the final, 6–2, 6–4 to win the girls' singles tennis title at the 1958 Wimbledon Championships.

Draw

Draw

References

External links

Girls' Singles
Wimbledon Championship by year – Girls' singles
Wimbledon Championships
Wimbledon Championships